Olympiacos Club of Fans of Piraeus, known simply as Olympiacos or Olympiacos Piraeus, is a Greek professional football club based in Piraeus, Attica. Part of the major multi-sport club Olympiacos CFP (Olympiakós Sýndesmos Filáthlon Peiraiós, "Olympic Club of Fans of Piraeus"), their name was inspired from the ancient Olympic Games and along with the club's emblem, the laurel-crowned Olympic athlete, symbolize the Olympic ideals of ancient Greece. Their home ground is the Karaiskakis Stadium, a 32,115-capacity stadium in Piraeus.

Founded on 10 March 1925, Olympiacos is the most successful club in Greek football history, having won 47 League titles, 28 Cups (18 Doubles) and 4 Super Cups, all records. Τotalling 79 national trophies, Olympiacos is 9th in the world in total titles won by a football club. The club's dominating success can be further evidenced by the fact that all other Greek clubs have won a combined total of 39 League titles, while Olympiacos also holds the record for the most consecutive Greek League titles won, with seven in a row in two occasions (1997–2003 and 2011–2017), breaking their own previous record of six consecutive wins in the 1950s (1954–1959), when Olympiacos was unequivocally nicknamed Thrylos. ("The Legend"). Having won the 2014–15 League title, Olympiacos became the only football club in the world to have won a series of five or more consecutive championships for five times in their history, a record that was praised by FIFA with a congratulatory letter of its president, Sepp Blatter. They are also the only Greek club to have won five consecutive national Cups (1957–1961) as well as six League titles undefeated (1937, 1938, 1948, 1951, 1954, 1955). Olympiacos are one of only three clubs to have never been relegated from the top flight of Greek football, and by winning the 2012–13 title, their 40th in total, they added a fourth star above their crest, each one representing 10 League titles.

In European competitions, Olympiacos best performances are their presence in the UEFA Champions League quarter-finals in 1998–99, losing the semi-final spot in the last minutes of their second leg match against Juventus, as well as in the UEFA Cup Winners' Cup quarter-finals in 1992–93. The Red-Whites are by far the highest ranked Greek club in the UEFA rankings, occupying the 37th place in Europe in the five-year ranking and the 30th in the ten-year ranking as of 2021, and one of the founding members of the European Club Association. Olympiacos won the Balkans Cup in 1963, at a time when the competition was considered the second most important in the region after the European Cup, becoming the first ever Greek club to win an international competition.

Olympiacos is the most popular football club in Greece, also being the most popular club among the population of Athens, and gathering strong support from Greek communities all over the world. With 83,000 registered members as of April 2006, the club was placed 9th in the 2006 list of football clubs with the most paying members in the world; that figure increased to 98,000 in 2014. Olympiacos share a long-standing rivalry with Panathinaikos, with whom they contest in the "derby of the eternal enemies", the most classic football derby in Greece and one of the most well known around the world.

History

Early years (1925–1931) 

Olympiacos was founded on 10 March 1925, in the Athenian port city of Piraeus. The club's initial aim, as stated in the statutes, was the systematic cultivation and development of its athletes' possibilities for participation in athletic competitions, the spreading of the Olympic athletic ideal and the promotion of sportsmanship and fanship among the youth according to egalitarian principles, by stressing a healthy, ethical and social basis as its foundation. Members of "Piraikos Podosfairikos Omilos FC" (Sport and Football Club of Piraeus) and "Piraeus Fans Club FC" decided, during a historical assembly, to dissolve the two clubs in order to establish a new unified one, which would bring this new vision and dynamic to the community. Notis Kamperos, a senior officer of the Hellenic Navy, proposed the name Olympiacos and the profile of a laurel-crowned Olympic winner as the emblem of the new club. Michalis Manouskos, a prominent Piraeus industrialist, expanded the name to its complete and current status, Olympiacos Syndesmos Filathlon Pireos. Besides Kamperos and Manouskos, among the most notable founding members were Stavros Maragoudakis, the post office director; Nikos Andronikos, a merchant; Dimitrios Sklias, a Hellenic Army officer; Nikolaos Zacharias, an attorney; Athanasios Mermigas, a notary public; Kostas Klidouchakis, who became the first goalkeeper in the club's history; Ioannis Kekkes, a stockbroker; and above all, the Andrianopoulos family. Andrianopoulos, a family of well-established Piraeus merchants, played a pivotal role in the founding of Olympiacos. The five brothers, Yiannis, Dinos, Giorgos, Vassilis and Leonidas Andrianopoulos raised the reputation of the club and brought it to its current glory. Yiannis, Dinos, Giorgos and Vassilis were the first to play, while Leonidas, the youngest of the five, made his debut later on and played for the club for eight years (1927–1935). The club's offensive line, made up of the five brothers, became legendary, rising to a mythical status and soon Olympiacos gained enormous popularity and became the most successful and well-supported club in Greece. Back then, their fan base consisted mainly of the working class, with the team's home ground at Neo Phaliron Velodrome, before moving to its current Karaiskakis Stadium. They became Piraeus Champions in 1925 and 1926.

In 1926, the Hellenic Football Federation was founded and organized the Panhellenic Championship in the 1927–1928 season. This was the first national championship, where the regional champions from EPSA league (Athens), EPSP league (Piraeus) and EPSM league (Thessaloniki) competed for the national title during play-offs, with Aris becoming the first champion. The Panhellenic Championship was organized in this manner up until 1958–59. However, in the second season (1928–29) a dispute arose between Olympiacos and the Hellenic Football Federation and as a result, the club did not participate in the championship, with Panathinaikos and AEK Athens deciding to follow Olympiacos. During the course of that season, the three of them played friendly games with each other and formed a group called P.O.K.

Meanwhile, the club continued to dominate the Piraeus Championship, winning the 1926–27, 1928–29, 1929–30 and 1930–31 titles and started establishing themselves as the leading force in Greek football; they set a record by remaining undefeated against all Greek teams for three consecutive seasons (14 March 1926 to 3 March 1929), counting 30 wins and 6 draws in 36 games. Those results ignited an enthusiastic reception from the Greek press, who called Olympiacos Thrylos ("Legend") for the first time in history. The fourth Panhellenic Championship took place in 1930–31 and found Olympiacos winning the Greece national league title for the first time ever, which was a milestone that marked the beginning of a very successful era in Olympiacos history. Olympiacos put in a great performance during the competition and won the title very convincingly with 11 wins, 2 draws and only one game lost. They managed to score 7 wins in 7 matches at home, beating Panathinaikos, AEK Athens, Aris, Iraklis and PAOK with the same score: 3–1. The sole exception was the match against Ethnikos, where Olympiacos netted 4 goals and won with 4–1. Besides the Andrianopoulos brothers and Kostas Klidouchakis, other notable players of the first era in the club's history (1925–1931) were Achilleas Grammatikopoulos, Lalis Lekkos, Philippos Kourantis, Nikos Panopoulos, Charalambos Pezonis and Kostas Terezakis.

Domination in Greece and World War II (1931–1946) 

The rise of the new decade marked a substantial rise in Panhellenic Championship's popularity throughout Greece. In October 1931, Giorgos and Yiannis Andrianopoulos, emblematic players and founding members of Olympiacos, retired from active football. However, new heroes emerged, such as Giannis Vazos, Christoforos Raggos, Theologos Symeonidis, Michalis Anamateros, Spyros Depountis, Aris Chrysafopoulos, Nikos Grigoratos, Panagis Korsianos as well as the iconic brothers Giannis and Vangelis Chelmis and the club won five Championships in nine seasons (1932–33, 1933–34, 1935–36, 1936–37, 1937–38) and by 1940, Olympiacos had already won six Championships in the eleven first seasons of the Panhellenic Championship. Especially Giannis Vazos, Christoforos Raggos and Theologos Symeonidis composed a formidable trio of attacking players, scoring numerous goals and became nothing short of legendary. Giannis Vazos played for 18 years for Olympiacos (1931–1949), and managed to score 450 goals in 364 games (179 goals in 156 official games) for the club, being the club's second all-time scorer, winning also the Greek Championship top scorer award four times (1933, 1936, 1937 and 1947).

In addition, the club managed to win the 1936–37 and 1937–38 Championship titles undefeated. Ιn Greek Cup, the team did not manage to win the competition in its first four editions, despite some outstanding wins such as the record-setting 1–6 away victory against Panathinaikos in Leoforos Stadium in 1932 (V. Andrianopoulos 16', 68', 88', Raggos 24', Vazos 69', 70'), which is the biggest away victory in this derby's history.

On 28 October 1940, Fascist Italy invaded Greece, and several Olympiacos players joined the Hellenic Army to fight against the Axis invaders. Chistoforos Raggos was heavily injured in his left leg in January 1941, and wasn't able to play football again. Leonidas Andrianopoulos suffered severe frostbite in the Albanian front and almost died, while Nikos Grigoratos was injured in the leg during the Battle of Klisura. Furthermore, after the subsequent German occupation of Greece, Olympiacos players joined the Greek Resistance and fought fiercely against the Nazis. Olympiacos player Nikos Godas, an emblematic figure for the club, was captain of the Greek People's Liberation Army (ELAS) and fought against the Germans in many fronts. He was executed wearing Olympiacos shirt and shorts, as was his last wish: "Shoot me and kill me with my Olympiacos shirt on, and do not blindfold me, I want to see the colours of my team before the final shot." Michalis Anamateros was also an active member of the Greek Resistance and was killed in 1944. Olympiacos paid a heavy price during the destructive war, the Axis occupation and the ensuing Greek Civil War and the club's progress was put on temporary hold.

The Legend (1946–1959) 

After the war, Olympiacos saw many of its key-players of the pre-war era retire, with many significant changes being made in the team's roster. Olympiacos captain and prolific scorer Giannis Vazos remained in the club, along with Giannis Chelmis. New important players joined the club, such as Andreas Mouratis, Alekos Chatzistavridis, Stelios Kourouklatos and Dionysis Minardos. As soon as regular fixtures recommenced, the Piraeus club returned to their dominant position in Greek football. From 1946 to 1959, Olympiacos won 9 out of the 11 Greek Championships (1947, 1948, 1951, 1954, 1955, 1956, 1957, 1958, 1959), bringing home 15 Championship titles in a total of 23 completed seasons of the Greek League. The six-straight Greek Championships won by Olympiacos from 1954 to 1959 was an unmatched achievement in Greek football history, an all-time record which stood for 44 years, up until Olympiacos managed to win seven-straight Greek Championships from 1997 to 2003.

Furthermore, during the same period (1946–1959), the club won 8 Greek Cups out of 13 editions (1947, 1951, 1952, 1953, 1954, 1957, 1958, 1959), thus completing 6 Doubles (1947, 1951, 1954, 1957, 1958, 1959), three of which being consecutive (1957–1959). The legendary Olympiacos team of the 1950s, with key performers such as Andreas Mouratis, Ilias Rossidis, Thanasis Bebis, Ilias Yfantis, Babis Kotridis, Kostas Polychroniou, Giorgos Darivas, Babis Drosos, Antonis Poseidon, Savvas Theodoridis, Kostas Karapatis, Mimis Stefanakos, Thanasis Kinley, Stelios Psychos, Giannis Ioannou, Themis Moustaklis, Vasilis Xanthopoulos, Dimitris Kokkinakis, Giorgos Kansos, Kostas Papazoglou and Aristeidis Papazoglou marked Olympiacos' period of absolute domination in Greek football, which skyrocketed the club's popularity and spread the word of Olympiacos' superiority throughout Greece. Hence, after the club's record-breaking performance in the trophy-laden era of the 1950s, the club gained unequivocally the nickname of Thrylos, meaning "The Legend".

On 13 September 1959, Olympiacos made its debut in Europe against Milan for the 1959–60 European Cup and became the first Greek club that ever played in the European competitions. The first leg was held at the Karaiskakis Stadium in Piraeus and Olympiacos took the lead with a goal by Kostas Papazoglou (1–0), which was the first goal ever scored by a Greek club (and by a Greek player as well) in the European competitions. Milan's prolific goalscorer José Altafini equalised the match with a header in the 33rd minute, after a cross by Giancarlo Danova. Ilias Yfantis scored an outstanding goal and gave Olympiacos the lead again in the 45th minute of the game, when he controlled the ball between Cesare Maldini and Vincenzo Occhetta and unleashed a powerful volley, burying the ball into the back of the net (2–1). Altafini scored his second goal once again with a header (72nd minute), after a free-kick by Nils Liedholm. The match ended 2–2, with Olympiacos putting in a great performance against the Italian champions, despite the fact that they had no foreign players in their roster, while Milan had four world-class foreign players, such as Altafini, Liedholm, Juan Alberto Schiaffino and Ernesto Grillo. In the second leg Milan won 3–1 (Giancarlo Danova 12', 26', 85'; Psychos 68') and qualified for the next round, despite Olympiacos' good performance especially in the second half.

First international success and Márton Bukovi era (1960–1972) 

Olympiacos entered the 1960s by winning the 1960 and 1961 Greek Cups, thus completing five consecutive Greek Cup wins, which is an all-time record in Greek football history. In this decade, a strong side was created with players from the late 1950s and new important players, such as Giannis Gaitatzis, Nikos Gioutsos, Pavlos Vasileiou, Vasilis Botinos, Giannis Fronimidis, Christos Zanteroglou, Grigoris Aganian, Stathis Tsanaktsis, Mimis Plessas, Giangos Simantiris, Pavlos Grigoriadis, Savvas Papazoglou, Stelios Besis, Sotiris Gavetsos, Tasos Sourounis, Vangelis Milisis, Orestis Pavlidis, Panagiotis Barbalias and last but not least the prolific goalscorer Giorgos Sideris, top-scorer in the club's history with 493 goals in 519 matches in all competitions (224 goals in 284 Greek Championship matches).

In 1963, Olympiacos became the first ever Greek club to win a non-domestic competition, winning the Balkans Cup, which marked the first international success by any Greek football club. The Balkans Cup was a very popular international competition in the 1960s (the 1967 final attracted 42.000 spectators), being the second most important international club competition for clubs from the Balkans (after the European Champions' Cup). Olympiacos topped his group after some notable wins, beating Galatasaray 1–0 at the Karaiskakis Stadium (Stelios Psychos 49'), as well as FK Sarajevo (3–2) and FC Brașov (1–0), bagging also two away draws against Galatasaray (1–1) in Mithatpaşa Stadium (Metin Oktay 78' – Aristeidis Papazoglou 6') and FK Sarajevo in Koševo Stadium (3–3). In the final, they faced Levski Sofia, winning the first match in Piraeus (1–0, Giorgos Sideris 37') and losing the second match in Vasil Levski Stadium with the same score. In the third decisive final in Istanbul (a neutral ground), Olympiacos beat Levski 1–0 in Mithatpaşa Stadium with a goal by Mimis Stefanakos in the 87th minute and won the Balkans Cup.

The club went on to win the 1963 and 1965 Greek Cups, completing seven Greek Cup titles in nine years. However, the years 1959–1965 were not fruitful for Olympiacos in the Greek Championship, as the team was not able to win the title for six years. This mediocre performance led Olympiacos board to hire the legendary Márton Bukovi as the club's head coach, with Mihály Lantos (prominent member of the Hungary national team of the 1950s widely known as the "Mighty Magyars" or "Aranycsapat") as his assistant coach. The innovative Hungarian coach, pioneer of the 4–2–4 formation (along with Béla Guttmann and Gusztáv Sebes) was a solid tactician and favoured attacking football and very demanding training sessions. Bukovi's innovatory tactics and groundbreaking training methods transformed Olympiacos and created a powerful, attacking team with constant player movement and solid combination game that often played spectacular football. Under Bukovi's guidance and with the great performance of key players such as Giorgos Sideris, Nikos Gioutsos, Kostas Polychroniou, Vasilis Botinos, Aristeidis Papazoglou, Pavlos Vasileiou, Giannis Gaitatzis, Christos Zanteroglou, Grigoris Aganian, Mimis Plessas, Giannis Fronimidis and Orestis Pavlidis, Olympiacos won 2 straight Greek Championships (1966, 1967). They won the 1966 title with 23 wins and 4 draws in 30 games and in the decisive away match against Trikala, an estimated 15,000 ecstatic Olympiacos fans swarmed into the city of Trikala to celebrate the win (0–5) and the Championship title after seven years.

The next season 1966–67, Olympiacos won 12 out of the first 14 games in the league, which was an all-time record in Greek football history, which lasted for 46 years and up until 2013, when Olympiacos, under coach Míchel's guidance, broke his own record by winning 13 out of the 14 first matches of the 2013–14 season. They won the title in a convincing way and with some notable wins, like the 4–0 smashing victory against arch-rivals Panathinaikos at the Karaiskakis Stadium (Vasileiou 17', Sideris 20', 35', 62'), where Olympiacos played spectacular football and missed a plethora of chances for a much bigger score. Bukovi became a legend for the club's fans and his creation, the Olympiacos team of 1965–67, became nothing short of legendary. A special anthem was written for Bukovi's Olympiacos and became popular throughout Greece: "Του Μπούκοβι την ομαδάρα, τη λένε Ολυμπιακάρα" ("Bukovi's mighty team is called Olympiacos").

Shortly before the end of the 1966–67 season, a military coup d'état took place and the Colonels seized power in Greece, establishing a dictatorship. The regime of the Colonels had devastating consequences for Olympiacos. In December 1967, Giorgos Andrianopoulos, club legend and president of the club for 13 years (1954–1967) was forced out of the club's presidency by the military regime. Furthermore, the regime canceled the transfer of Giorgos Koudas to Olympiacos and days later another blow was delivered to the club: Márton Bukovi, already a legend and architect of the great 1965–67 team, was forced out of Greece by the military junta, being labeled a communist. He left Greece on 21 December 1967, along with Mihály Lantos.

Goulandris era (1972–1975) 

Another chapter began in 1972, after Nikos Goulandris became president of the club. He reinstated all the prominent members of Olympiacos board that had been forced out by the military regime (including Giorgos Andrianopoulos) and opened-up the member election process, establishing a new, trustworthy board of directors. He appointed Lakis Petropoulos as head coach and signed top-class players, creating a great roster with key performers such as Giorgos Delikaris, Yves Triantafyllos, Julio Losada, Milton Viera, Panagiotis Kelesidis, Michalis Kritikopoulos, Takis Synetopoulos, Romain Argyroudis, Maik Galakos, Nikos Gioutsos, Giannis Gaitatzis, Vasilis Siokos, Thanasis Angelis, Lakis Glezos, Petros Karavitis, Kostas Davourlis, Giannis Kyrastas, Dimitris Persidis, Lefteris Poupakis and Babis Stavropoulos. Under Goulandris' presidency, Olympiacos won the Greek Championship three times in a row (1972–73, 1973–74, 1974–75), combining it with the Greek Cup in 1973 (beating PAOK 1–0 in the final) and 1975 (beating Panathinaikos 1–0 in the final) to celebrate two Doubles in three years. Ιn the 1972–73 season, Olympiacos won the title by conceding only 13 goals in 34 matches, which is an-all-time record in Greek football history. The team's best year though, was undoubtedly the 1973–74 season, when Olympiacos won the league with 26 wins and 7 draws in 34 games, scoring an all-time record of 102 goals and conceding only 14.

In European competitions, they managed to eliminate Cagliari in the 1972–73 UEFA Cup, a major force in Italian football during the late 1960s and the early 1970s, (1970 Serie A Champions, 1972 Serie A title contenders), with world-class Italian international players like Gigi Riva, Angelo Domenghini, Enrico Albertosi, Pierluigi Cera, Sergio Gori and Fabrizio Poletti. Olympiacos managed to beat Cagliari twice, 2–1 in Piraeus and 1–0 in Cagliari, becoming the first ever Greek football club to win on Italian soil. In the next round they faced the competition's defending champions Tottenham Hotspur, who were undefeated for 16-straight games in all European competitions. Olympiacos did not manage to qualify against Spurs, but they managed to get a 1–0 win in Piraeus, which ended Tottenham's undefeated streak and marked the first ever victory of a Greek football club against an English side. Two years later, Olympiacos entered the 1974–75 European Cup and they were drawn to face Kenny Dalglish's Celtic, one of the strongest teams in European football at that time and semi-finalists of the previous season. The first leg was played in Celtic Park, where Celtic had never been defeated, running an undefeated streak of 36 straight home games in all European competitions (27 wins, 9 draws) from 1962 to 1974. Olympiacos took the lead through Milton Viera's strike in the 36th minute, with Celtic equalising late in the game. The away draw gave Olympiacos the advantage and they finished the job in Piraeus, after a spectacular 2–0 win against the Scottish Champions with Kritikopoulos and Stavropoulos finding the net. In the next round, they were drawn to play against Anderlecht for a place in the quarter-finals of the competition. Anderlecht won the first leg with 5–1 and Olympiacos' task seemed impossible. In the second leg in Greece, however, Olympiacos put on a dominant display and almost reached a winning score in a match that was marked by referee Károly Palotai's decisions. Olympiacos beat Anderlecht 3–0, while Palotai disallowed four Olympiacos goals and did not give at least three clear penalties committed by Anderlecht players, while Stavropoulos was shown a red card for no good reason. The match is widely known in Greece as the "Palotai massacre" with Olympiacos coming close to one of the biggest comebacks in European Cup history.

Domination in the early 1980s, UEFA Cup quarter-finalists (1975–1996) 
Following Goulandris resignation from the presidency in 1975, the team went through a relative dry spell in the second half of the 1970s. However, in the summer of 1979, the Greek championship turned professional and Stavros Daifas became owner and president of the club. Olympiacos emerged again as the dominant force in Greek football, winning the title four times in a row (1980, 1981, 1982, 1983) with players like the relentless goalscorer Nikos Anastopoulos, Martin Novoselac, Vicente Estavillo, Thomas Ahlström, Roger Albertsen, Maik Galakos, Tasos Mitropoulos, Takis Nikoloudis, Nikos Sarganis, Nikos Vamvakoulas, Giorgos Kokolakis, Vangelis Kousoulakis, Petros Michos, Takis Lemonis, Christos Arvanitis, Petros Xanthopoulos, Stavros Papadopoulos, Meletis Persias, Giorgos Togias and Kostas Orfanos. Kazimierz Górski, the iconic Polish coach, led Olympiacos to the 1980, 1981 and 1983 titles (winning also the Double in 1981, the 9th Double in Olympiacos' history) while Alketas Panagoulias, who had also been manager of the Greece national football team and the United States national team as well, led the team to the 1982 title after a memorable 2–1 win (Estavillo 6', Anastopoulos 69') against arch-rivals Panathinaikos in the crucial Championship final match in Volos. With Panagoulias as head coach, Olympiacos won the 1986–87 title as well, having a solid roster with players from the early 1980s like Anastopoulos, Mitropoulos, Michos, Xanthopoulos and other strong players like Miloš Šestić, Giorgos Vaitsis, Jorge Barrios, Andreas Bonovas, Alexis Alexiou and Vasilis Papachristou.

Olympiacos experienced its darkest days from the late-1980s until the mid-'90s. In the mid-'80s, Olympiacos came into the hands of Greek businessman George Koskotas who was soon accused of and convicted for embezzlement, leaving Olympiacos deep in debt. The club went through a period of administrative turbulence until 1993, when Sokratis Kokkalis became majority shareholder and president of the club. As soon as he took the club's presidency, Kokkalis agreed a settlement to pay off all the club's debts and started reorganising and restructuring the club. On the pitch, the team, with all the financial and managerial problems, as well as the lack of strong administrative leadership until the Kokkalis arrival, spent nine seasons without a league title, from 1988 to 1996, despite the foreign top-class players that played for the club at that period, such as Lajos Détári, Oleh Protasov, Juan Gilberto Funes, Bent Christensen, Hennadiy Lytovchenko, Yuri Savichev, Andrzej Juskowiak, Daniel Batista, Fabián Estay and the backbone of solid Greek players like Vassilis Karapialis, Kiriakos Karataidis, Giotis Tsalouchidis, Nikos Tsiantakis, Giorgos Vaitsis, Minas Hantzidis, Theodoros Pahatouridis, Savvas Kofidis, Chris Kalantzis, Gιorgοs Mitsibonas, Ilias Talikriadis, Alekos Rantos, Panagiotis Sofianopoulos, Ilias Savvidis and Michalis Vlachos. This period is so called as Olympiacos' stone years. Nevertheless, the club brought home the 1990 (beating OFI Crete 4–2 in the final) and 1992 Greek Cups (beating PAOK 2–0 in the second leg of the double final in Piraeus), as well as the 1992 Greek Super Cup, beating AEK 3–1 in the final. In addition, the team, under the guidance of the legendary Ukrainian coach Oleg Blokhin, managed to reach the quarter-finals of the 1992–93 UEFA Cup Winners' Cup, eliminating Arsène Wenger's Monaco, after a hard-fought 1–0 away win in Stade Louis II with a late goal by Giorgos Vaitsis and a goalless draw at Karaiskakis Stadium in the second leg. They did not manage to qualify for the semi-finals, however, as they were eliminated by Atlético Madrid (1–1 draw at home, 3–1 loss in Madrid).

The Golden Era (1996–2010)

Seven consecutive Championships, near-miss to UEFA Champions League semi-finals (1996–2003) 

In 1996, Socratis Kokkalis appointed Dušan Bajević as the team's head coach. By that time, Olympiacos had already a very strong roster, with players like Kyriakos Karataidis, Vassilis Karapialis, Grigoris Georgatos, Alexis Alexandris, Giorgos Amanatidis, Nikos Dabizas and Ilija Ivić. Upon Bajević's arrival, Kokkalis opted to strengthen the team significantly in order to create a very strong roster that would dominate Greek football for years to come. He purchased the highly rated prospects Predrag Đorđević and Stelios Giannakopoulos from Paniliakos, outbidding both AEK Athens and Panathinaikos; signed Refik Šabanadžović, Andreas Niniadis, Giorgos Anatolakis and Alekos Kaklamanos; and brought Olympiacos Academy product Dimitris Eleftheropoulos back from his loan spell at Proodeftiki. With all these players up front, Olympiacos strode to the 1996–97 title by 12 clear points over AEK and 20 points over the third Panathinaikos in Bajević's first season in charge; this was the club's first Greek Championship in nine seasons, putting an end to the "stone years" and officially beginning Olympiacos' era of domination. In the next season, 1997–98, Dimitris Mavrogenidis, Siniša Gogić, Ilias Poursanidis and the Ghanaian striker Peter Ofori-Quaye were transferred to the club and Olympiacos won the 1997–98 Championship. Bajević's team, along with AEK and Panathinaikos, were closely separated in the table, but finally Olympiacos made an important away win against Panathinaikos (0–2) and celebrated the second consecutive Championship, with three points difference from Panathinaikos. Olympiacos participated for the first time in the UEFA Champions League group stage and took third place in a tough group, leaving Porto in fourth place, while Real Madrid, the eventual champions, topped the group and qualified for the quarter-finals.

The 1998–99 season was undoubtedly one of the best seasons in Olympiacos history. They won the 1998–99 Greek Championship quite convincingly, with ten points difference from AEK and 11 from third-placed Panathinaikos, and also celebrated the domestic double, bringing home the 1998–99 Greek Cup after a convincing 2–0 win against arch-rivals Panathinaikos in the final (Mavrogenidis 54', Ofori-Quaye 90'), despite the fact that they played for more than 60 minutes in the game with ten players. In European competitions, they entered the 1998–99 UEFA Champions League group stage, being drawn in a group with Ajax, Porto and Croatia Zagreb. They won the group and qualified to the quarter-finals, gathering 11 points with 3 home wins against Ajax (1–0), Porto (2–1) and Croatia Zagreb (2–0) and two away draws in Porto (2–2) and Zagreb (1–1). In the quarter-finals of the competition, they faced Juventus, with the first leg in Turin. Juventus took a 2–0 lead, but Olympiacos scored a crucial away goal in the 90th minute of the game with a penalty by Andreas Niniadis, a goal that caused the 10.000 Olympiacos fans who travelled to Italy to erupt into joyous ecstasy. In the second leg in Athens, Olympiacos totally dominated the match, and scored the goal that put them in the driving seat in the 12th minute of the game, when Siniša Gogić's powerful header found the back of the net after Grigoris Georgatos's superb cross. They also missed an outstanding chance to double the lead, when Giorgos Amanatidis' powerful header from short distance was saved by Michelangelo Rampulla. Olympiacos kept the ticket to the semi-finals in his hands until the 85th minute, when Juventus, who hadn't produced any chances in the game, equalised the score after a crucial mistake by Dimitris Eleftheropoulos, who had been the team's hero in all the previous games. Despite the big disappointment from the way the qualification to the semi-finals was lost, the presence of the team in the Champions League quarter-finals, their best-ever European campaign, combined with the domestic double, marked a very successful season for the club, arguably the best in their long history.

The next four seasons (1999–2000, 2000–01, 2001–02, 2002–03) Olympiacos signed world-class players of great magnitude such as Giovanni, Zlatko Zahovič and the World champion Christian Karembeu, as well as other top-class players including Pär Zetterberg, Zé Elias, Nery Castillo, Christos Patsatzoglou, Lampros Choutos and Stelios Venetidis. These transfers strengthened even more the already strong roster from the previous successful years and under the guidance of coaches like Giannis Matzourakis, Takis Lemonis and Oleg Protasov (Bajević had left the club in 1999). Olympiacos managed to win seven consecutive Greek Championships (1997–2003), breaking their own past record of six (1954–1959). Olympiacos won their seventh consecutive title after a breathtaking closing of the 2002–03 Greek League: Olympiacos was hosting arch-rivals Panathinaikos in matchday 29, who led the table with a three-point difference. Olympiacos needed to win the derby by two clear goals in order to overthrow their rivals in the championship race. Olympiacos beat Panathinaikos 3–0 (Giovanni 3', Giannakopoulos 15' 48') in a dominant display in Rizoupoli and celebrated the all-time record of seven straight Championships, which was a dream and a historic objective for the club and especially for the fans.

Five consecutive Championships, Two presences in UEFA Champions League knockout phase (2004–2010) 

In 2004, Olympiacos rehired Dušan Bajević and signed the 1999 World Footballer of the Year and 2002 World Champion Brazilian superstar Rivaldo and the 2004 European champion Antonis Nikopolidis. The end of the season found Olympiacos winning the domestic double and having a decent Champions League display, gathering ten points in a tough group alongside Liverpool, Monaco and Deportivo de La Coruña and losing the qualification to the knockout phase in the last four minutes of the last game against the eventual European champions Liverpool at Anfield. Bajević left the club and the Norwegian coach Trond Sollied was hired in his place. They club signed Cypriot striker Michalis Konstantinou from Panathinaikos, 2004 European champion defender Michalis Kapsis from Bordeaux and the versatile box-to-box Ivorian midfielder Yaya Touré. During the 2005–06 season, Olympiacos won all the four derbies against their major rivals, Panathinaikos and AEK Athens, something only achieved once more, during the season 1972–73. The combined goal total in these four matches was 11–3 in favour of Olympiacos. They also beat AEK Athens 3–0 in the Greek Cup Final to clinch their second-straight double and managed to win an all-time record of 16 consecutive matches in the championship, breaking their own past record.

After a record-breaking season, in the 2006 summer transfers, Trond Sollied signed Michał Żewłakow, Júlio César and Tomislav Butina among others. However, he did not live up to expectations in the 2006–07 Champions League and was replaced by Takis Lemonis at the end of 2006. Lemonis transferred the young star Vasilis Torosidis, and led Olympiacos in their third consecutive championship, but failed to win the Greek Cup after a surprise elimination by PAS Giannina.

In the summer of 2007, Olympiacos made very expensive transfers like Luciano Galletti, Darko Kovačević, Raúl Bravo, Lomana LuaLua, Cristian Ledesma and Leonel Núñez. They also brought back the solid Greek defender Paraskevas Antzas and signed the very talented young striker Kostas Mitroglou from Borussia Mönchengladbach. Furthermore, they accomplished the most lucrative sale in Greek football history after selling striker-midfielder Nery Castillo to Ukrainian club Shakhtar Donetsk for the record sum of €20 million ($27.5M). Because of a clause in Castillo's contract, Olympiacos received €15 million, with the remaining €5 million given directly to the player. Furthermore, a controversy started between the team and Rivaldo, as Olympiacos did not wish to renew the player's contract despite the fact that Rivaldo had featured heavily in the club's successful campaigns, both in Greece and abroad. Former player Ilija Ivić was selected for the role of the team's football director. The team did not start well in the Greek championship, but it achieved a stunning performance in the Champions League, qualifying for the last 16 as they finished second in their group, level on 11 points with group winners Real Madrid, eliminating Werder Bremen and Lazio. However, the team's less than satisfactory performance in the league, coupled with the defeat from Chelsea in Stamford Bridge for the knockout phase, prompted club owner Sokratis Kokkalis to sack coach Takis Lemonis. The team's assistant manager, José Segura, coached the team for the remainder of the season. Olympiacos managed to win both the Greek Championship and Cup, but Segura left the club at the end of the season.

In the summer of 2008, Olympiacos made prominent transfers, signing Dudu Cearense, Avraam Papadopoulos, Diogo Luis Santo and Matt Derbyshire and appointed Ernesto Valverde as the new coach with a three-year contract worth approximately €6 million. The 2008–09 season started badly for Olympiacos, with the team losing their first few official matches, against Anorthosis Famagusta for the Champions League third qualifying round, and was eliminated from the tournament, which resulted to a seat in the UEFA Cup first round, where Olympiacos beat Nordsjælland to qualify for the group stage. The team also started well in the 2008–09 Super League Greece, winning every match at home, but facing difficulties away. They ended up winning the Greek Championship and the Greek Cup, celebrating the 14th double in Olympiacos history. After an impressive UEFA Cup run at home, with some spectacular wins against Benfica (5–1) and Hertha BSC (4–0), the team managed to get through to the round of 32, facing French side Saint-Étienne.

In the summer of 2009, Olympiacos signed major players, such as Olof Mellberg from Juventus for €2.5 million, midfielder Jaouad Zairi from Asteras Tripolis and Enzo Maresca from Sevilla. Many other players returned from loan spells, such as former Real Madrid defender Raúl Bravo, Georgios Katsikogiannis and midfielder Cristian Ledesma. Olympiacos appointed former Brazil legend Zico as their coach and started the 2009–10 season with great success, as they qualified for the Champions League final 16, finishing second in Group H only 3 points behind Arsenal, despite the absence of numerous first-team players due to injuries. They faced Bordeaux in the final 16 and lost the first match at home (0–1). In the second match, despite Bordeaux's early lead, Olympiacos leveled the match and missed some great chances to score a second goal, before eventually losing in the dying moments of the match (1–2). Domestically, Olympiacos secured a 2–0 derby win over arch-rivals Panathinaikos, with striker Kostas Mitroglou scoring twice. However, this was only a highlight in an otherwise below-par season for the club, as they not only lost the championship to Panathinaikos, but were also defeated in four out of their six playoff games, eventually finishing last, in the 5th position of the league table; this result marked the team's worst ranking since being placed 8th in 1988, and meant that the club would start their Europa League campaign from the second qualifying round the following season.

New presidency, seven consecutive championships and European ascent (2010–2017) 

In 2010, Evangelos Marinakis, a successful shipping magnate, bought the team from Sokratis Kokkalis. During the first year of his presidency, Marinakis appointed fans' favourite Ernesto Valverde as coach (who came back for a second tenure in the club) and signed players with international pedigree, such as Albert Riera, Ariel Ibagaza, Kevin Mirallas, Marko Pantelić and François Modesto. As a result, Olympiacos won the Greek title for the 38th time in its history, 13 points ahead of second-placed Panathinaikos.

In the 2011–12 season, the team's roster was strengthened with players like Jean Makoun, Pablo Orbaiz, Iván Marcano, Rafik Djebbour and Djamel Abdoun and with Ernesto Valverde as their coach for the second straight season, Olympiacos had a very successful campaign both domestically and internationally. They won both the Greek league and the Greek Cup to complete the 15th domestic double in the club's history. In European competitions, Olympiacos had a solid Champions League campaign, having been drawn in Group F against Arsenal, Borussia Dortmund and Marseille. Despite delivering nine points in the group, with two emphatic wins against Arsenal and Dortmund at home (both with a 3–1 scoreline) and an away win against Marseille (0–1), they lost the qualification to the knock-out stage after Marseille's controversial 2–3 away win in Dortmund in game 6, with Marseille scoring two goals in the last five minutes of the match to come back from an early 2–0 Dortmund lead. Olympiacos continued in Europa League where he was drawn to play against Rubin Kazan. The Greek champions eliminated the Russian side with two wins (1–0 in both Kazan and Piraeus) and were up to play against Metalist Kharkiv in the Last 16 of the competition. They won the first match in Ukraine with David Fuster scoring the winning goal (0–1) but in the second match, despite their early lead and the plethora of missed chances (they hit the woodwork twice in the first half), they conceded two goals in the last nine minutes of the game and lost the qualification to the quarter-finals.

At the end of the season, Ernesto Valverde announced his decision to return to Spain, thus ending his second successful spell at Olympiacos. The club announced the Portuguese Leonardo Jardim as their new head coach. The team performed very well in the Greek league and had a decent Champions league campaign, gathering nine points in Group B, after wins against Arsenal (2–1 at home) and Montpellier (1–2 in Montpellier, 3–1 in Piraeus). Despite the relatively good results, Leonardo Jardim was replaced by the Spanish coach and Real Madrid legend Míchel. The team went on to celebrate the 16th double in their history by winning their 40th Greek Championship, 15 points ahead the second PAOK, as well as their 26th Greek Cup after a 3–1 win against Asteras Tripolis in the final. The 40th Greek championship title gave Olympiacos the fourth star on top of the club's emblem, which was a major goal for the club and especially for the fans.

The expectations for the 2013–14 season were very high, especially after the signing of players such as striker Javier Saviola, Joel Campbell, Roberto, Alejandro Domínguez, Vladimír Weiss, Delvin N'Dinga and Leandro Salino. Olympiacos had a great season both domestically and internationally. In Europe, they were drawn in Group C of the 2013–14 Champions League alongside Paris Saint-Germain, Benfica and Anderlecht. After a strong performance in the group, Olympiacos finished second with ten points and qualified for the Last 16 at the expense of Benfica (1–0 win in Piraeus, 1–1 draw in Lisbon) and Anderlecht (0–3 win in Brussels, 3–1 win in Piraeus). In the round of 16, they were drawn to play against Manchester United. Olympiacos, after a solid display, won the first leg with a comfortable 2–0 (Alejandro Domínguez 38', Campbell 55'), in a match where they dominated totally and missed chances to even extend the lead. Despite the two-goal advantage which put them within touching distance of a quarter-final place for the first time since 1999, Olympiacos lost 3–0 in the second leg in Old Trafford, having missed an outstanding double chance to equalize the score in the 40th minute. The Greek champions pushed on in the last ten minutes to find the crucial away goal, but to no avail. Although the ticket to the quarter-finals slipped out of the club's hands, Olympiacos' overall performance and the fact that the club managed to qualify to the knockout phase (round of 16) of the Champions League for the third time in six years (2007–08, 2009–10, 2013–14), marked a very successful European campaign. Domestically, Olympiacos won their history's 41st Greek Championship very convincingly, 17 points ahead of second-placed PAOK.

In the 2014–15 season, Olympiacos entered the 2014–15 Champions League group stage with hopes to repeat the previous year's performance; they were drawn alongside Atlético Madrid, Juventus and Malmö FF. They had a solid performance in the group, managing to beat last year's runners-up Atlético 3–2 and eventual finalists Juventus 1–0 at the Karaiskakis Stadium, but they lost the qualification for the knockout stage in the last game: Olympiacos beat Malmö FF 4–2 at home but at the same time Juventus were drawing against Atlético in Italy, securing the crucial one point they needed to qualify. Had Olympiacos and Juventus finished with the same points, Olympiacos would have qualified due to best aggregate score (away goals) of their two games (1–0 Olympiacos win in Piraeus, 3–2 Juventus win in Turin). The third place in the group gave Olympiacos the ticket for the next round of UEFA Europa League, where they were eliminated by the eventual runners-up Dnipro Dnipropetrovsk. Domestically, the team had a very successful season, winning the 17th double in their history. They won their 42nd Greek Championship with 12 points difference from the second Panathinaikos and their 27th Greek Cup, beating Skoda Xanthi 3–1 in the final.

The 2015–16 season started with a new manager replacement, as Marco Silva took over the management over his fellow countryman Vitor Pereira, while the squad was strengthened with the world-class presence of Esteban Cambiasso and a number of other players with European competition experience, including Kostas Fortounis, Felipe Pardo, Sebá, Manuel Da Costa, Brown Ideye and Alfreð Finnbogason. In a tough Champions League group that included Bayern München, Arsenal and Dinamo Zagreb, Olympiacos managed to record 9 points through a 3–2 away win over the Gunners at the Emirates Stadium, considered by many as one of the club's most important European victories, as well as two more wins against Dinamo (1–0 away and 2–1 at home). Last matchday saw the team face Arsenal at the Karaiskakis stadium, needing a 1–0 or 2–1 defeat to the Gunners, as the worst-case scenario, to advance to the knockout phase of the competition based on the away goals rule; the Red-Whites eventually lost 3–0 and continued their European journey in the UEFA Europa League, where they were eliminated by Anderlecht in the first knockout stage. Despite the above, Olympiacos broke the record for most European competition victories recorded by a Greek club, with 97 over the 96 of second-placed Panathinaikos as of the summer of 2016. Domestically, Olympiacos had perhaps their most successful season in years, as the team managed to secure their 43rd Greek Championship, and 6th consecutive, on the last day of February 2016, considered a national record for the earliest time, within a league campaign, when a title is clinched. The team managed to finish their league campaign with a 30-point difference over their arch rivals Panathinaikos, who came in second. The team's 85 points over the course of 30 matchdays, including a 28–1–1 overall result breakdown with 13 away wins and a perfect 15 victories out of 15 home games, are also considered a national record. However, despite the club's expectations of doing the double, they did not manage to win the Greek Cup as they finished runners-up to rivals AEK after a 2–1 loss in the final.

The 2016–17 season proved to be rather tumultuous for the club, despite the signing of such key players as Óscar Cardozo, Tarik Elyounoussi, Alaixys Romao, Aly Cissokho and Marko Marin. The main issues that arose were the team's shock elimination from Israeli outfit Hapoel Be'er-Sheva, after a 1–0 aggregate defeat, in the third qualifying round of the UEFA Champions League, and the highly frequent change of managers, leading the club to having been coached by five individuals over the same season: Marco Silva, Victor Sánchez (responsible for the elimination from Hapoel), Paulo Bento, Vasilis Vouzas and Takis Lemonis. The team's UEFA Europa League journey was not as successful as other European campaigns, starting with a difficult 3–1 aggregate victory (1–1 before extra time) over Arouca in the playoffs, continuing with the team's qualification from the group stage but only as second-placed to APOEL (in a group that also included Young Boys and Astana), and ending with a heavy 5–2 aggregate defeat to Besiktas in the last 16 of the knockout stage (with goalkeeper Nicola Leali being highly responsible for 4 out of the 5 goals conceded), despite having advanced from the last 32 thanks to a 3–0 aggregate win over Osmanlispor. The frequent manager change negatively affected the team's stability and rhythm in domestic competitions as well. Firstly, Olympiacos failed to qualify for the Greek Cup final after being ousted by AEK, who advanced on the away goals rule after a 2–2 aggregate draw. Secondly, despite the fact that the Reds clinched their 44th Greek Championship, and 7th consecutive for the second time in Greek football history, they only managed to do so with a six-point difference (67 to 61) over PAOK.

2017–present 

At the start of the 2017–18 season, the board decided to hire former Anderlecht manager Besnik Hasi to guide Olympiacos back to the UEFA Champions League group stage after a year's absence. Upon his arrival, Hasi strengthened the squad with players as Vadis Odjidja-Ofoe, Guillaume Gillet, Mehdi Carcela, Jagoš Vuković, Björn Engels, Uroš Đurđević, Emmanuel Emenike and Panagiotis Tachtsidis.

Aggregate victories over Partizan (5–3) and Rijeka (3–1) in the two final qualifying rounds ensured the Red-Whites' presence in Group D of the competition, considered perhaps the toughest in Olympiacos' European history due to Barcelona, Juventus and Sporting CP being the opponents. A disheartening 2–3 defeat in the hands of Sporting at Thrylos' European season opener, combined with a 3–2 loss to AEK despite being 0–2 up, led to Hasi's dismissal from the club and his replacement by Takis Lemonis. The latter decided to focus on getting the squad back on track in domestic competitions, at a time when Olympiacos eventually got eliminated from Europe ahead of the Christmas break for the first time in 12 years. Following a home goalless draw against Barcelona and five defeats, the Red-Whites only managed to acquire one point during their entire Champions League group stage campaign, something considered a setback for the club after their 7 previous UEFA Champions League campaigns (2007–08, 2009–10, 2011–12, 2012–13, 2013–14, 2014–15, 2015–16), in which they gathered at least 9 points in all of the groups (11 points in 2007–08, 10 points in 2009–10, 9 points in 2011–12, 9 points in 2012–13, 10 points in 2013–14, 9 points in 2014–15 and 9 points in 2015–16), with three qualifications to the knockout stage (Last 16) of the competition. Despite their one-point group stage exit, the worst European records by a Greek team in the history of European competitions both belong to AEK Athens: AEK's zero (0) point campaign in Group E of the 2018–19 UEFA Champions League and AEK's zero (0) point campaign as well in the Group H of the 2004–05 UEFA Cup, a lower-tier UEFA competition. Panathinaikos has also a one-point campaign in Group G of the 2016–17 UEFA Europa League. Despite being in the Super League lead halfway through the season, Lemonis was dismissed on grounds of dressing room instability, and Óscar García was subsequently appointed with a vision of increasing attacking efficiency and discipline. Domestically, Olympiacos' Greek Cup run ended in the quarter-finals, marking their third consecutive year that they failed to lift the Cup. In the Super League the Red-Whites conceded the title to AEK three matchdays before completion, thus ending a run of seven consecutive championship wins and leading to the dismissal of García after two months at the club's helm, with Christos Kontis finishing the season as caretaker manager. Portuguese Pedro Martins was appointed head coach in order to lead Olympiacos at the following 2018–19 season.

After four seasons and winning 3 League titles with the club, Martins got fired from Olympiacos, in August 2022, and Spanish prodigy Carlos Corberán was appointed as the new head coach.

Crest and colours 
When, in 1925, the merger of the two clubs of Piraeus, Athlitikos Podosfairikos Syllogos Pireos and Omilos Filathlon Pireos, gave birth to the new football club, the latter was unanimously baptized Olympiacos Club of Fans of Piraeus, a name inspired from the Ancient Olympic Games, the morality, the vying, the splendor, the sportsmanship and the fair play ideal that were represented in Ancient Greece. Consequently, after Notis Kamperos's proposal, the club adopted the laurel-crowned adolescent as their emblem, which symbolizes the Olympic Games winner, a crest that underwent minor changes through the ages. Red and white were chosen as the colours of the crest; red for the passion and victory and white for the virtue and purity.

The typical kit of the team is that of a shirt with red and white vertical stripes, and red or white shorts and socks. The shirt has taken different forms during the history of the club, for example with thin or wider stripes. The second most common kit is the all-red one and next the all-white one. Olympiacos has used several other colours during its history as an away or third kit, with the most notable of them being the monotint black or silver one. The most common kits of Olympiacos during their history are these below (the year of each one is indicant):

Kit evolution

Kit manufacturers and shirt sponsors 

Since 1979, when football became professional in Greece, Olympiacos had a specific kit manufacturer and since 1982 a specific shirt sponsor as well. The following table shows in detail Olympiacos kit manufacturers and shirt sponsors by year:

Stadium 

The Karaiskakis Stadium, situated at Neo Faliro in Piraeus, is the current (since 2004) and traditional home of Olympiacos. With a capacity of 32,115, it is the largest football-only stadium and the second largest football stadium overall in Greece. It was built in 1895 as Neo Phaliron Velodrome, to host the cycling events for the 1896 Summer Olympics in Athens, and the pitch was covered with curm. Olympiacos started using it since its foundation in 1925. In 1964, the stadium was renovated and was given its current name after Georgios Karaiskakis, a military commander of the Greek War of Independence, with an athletics track around the pitch.

Olympiacos left the Karaiskakis Stadium temporarily to play home matches at the newly built Athens Olympic Stadium in 1984. After a five-year use (1984–1989) of the biggest stadium in Greece, the team returned to their traditional home, where they played until 1997. It was then that Olympiacos got back to the Athens Olympic Stadium, where they stayed for another period of five years (1997–2002). In 2002, the Olympic Stadium was closed for renovation works due to the 2004 Summer Olympics and Olympiacos moved to the Georgios Kamaras Stadium in Rizoupoli, home of Apollon Smyrnis, for the following two seasons (2002–2004).

Meanwhile, the Karaiskakis Stadium had fallen in disrepair and was not anymore suitable for football matches. In 2003, its use passed to Olympiacos in order to build a football-only ground, to be used for the football tournament of the 2004 Olympics. In return, Olympiacos got exclusive use of the stadium until 2052, covering all maintenance costs and also paying 15% of revenue to the Greek State. The old stadium was demolished in the spring of 2003 and the new one was completed on 30 June 2004 at a total cost of €60 million. Nowadays, the Karaiskakis Stadium is one of the most modern football grounds in Europe, also hosting the museum of Olympiacos, with several facilities around.

Support 

Olympiacos' traditional fanbase comes from the city of Piraeus, where the club is based, as well as a good part of the rest of the Athens area. The club's popularity increased during the 1950s after winning consecutive titles and setting several records, and they became the best-supported football club in the country. Traditionally, Olympiacos used to represent the working class, but the club has always attracted fans from all the social classes and their fanbase is not associated with any specific social group anymore.

Olympiacos is the most popular Greek club according to UEFA and numerous polls and researches. Several newspapers and magazines' polls rank Olympiacos as the most popular club in Greece with a percentage varying between 30 and 40% among the fans and more or less 30% in total population, which corresponds to around three and a half millions of supporters in Greece. The club is overwhelmingly popular in Piraeus, where almost half of its population supports Olympiacos, while their support in the whole of Athens reaches 30% of the fans, making them the 3rd most popular club in the Greek capital. They are also the most popular club in the working class with a percentage of 37% and in all age groups, as well as among both male and female fans; the vast majority of their fans comes from the centre-left and centre-right of the political spectrum. Outside of Athens, Olympiacos is the most popular club in Central Greece, the Peloponnese, Thessaly  Additionally, they have the highest average all-time attendance in Greek football, having topped the attendance tables in most of the seasons in Super League Greece history.

Friendships 
 Red Star Belgrade
 Spartak Moscow

In 2006, Olympiacos was placed in the top ten of the clubs with the most paying members in the world, holding ninth place, just ahead of Real Madrid. As of April 2006, the club had some 83,000 registered members. Olympiacos and Red Star Belgrade fans have developed a deep friendship, calling themselves the "Orthodox Brothers". Usually, Olympiacos supporters from several fan-clubs attend Red Star's matches, especially against their old rival Partizan, and vice versa. More recently, the Orthodox Brothers have started to include fans of Spartak Moscow in their club.

Olympiacos fans are renowned for their passionate and fervent support to the team, with the atmosphere at home matches regarded as intimidating. When they played Newcastle United at home in the 2004–05 UEFA Cup, the match was televised in the United Kingdom on Channel 5 and the guest commentator was former England international Tony Cottee, who was constantly mentioning how great the atmosphere was. During the game he was asked whether it was the most atmospheric stadium he had been to and replied: "I'd have to say it probably is. You hear a lot about various places and the atmosphere there but when you go you realise it's not all that... But this place is the real deal." The experienced Czech international winger Jaroslav Plašil paid further testament to the hostile atmosphere created by Olympiacos fans at home before his team Bordeaux visit the Karaiskakis Stadium, where he had played during his time with Monaco and stated, "It was one of the most intense atmospheres I've ever experienced in a stadium, so I expect it will be a bit like hell for us. Their supporters really can help their team." Former Paris Saint-Germain superstar striker Zlatan Ibrahimović spoke of his admiration for Olympiacos supporters after an Olympiacos–Paris Saint-Germain match on 17 September 2013: "They played in front of their fantastic public. Olympiacos supporters were amazing. My friend Olof Mellberg played here and he talked to me about the supporters. I never saw it live, but now I understand. It's amazing. It's a big advantage for Olympiacos." PSG billionaire owner Nasser Al-Khelaifi stated, "I have big respect for the fans here. I've never seen fans like Olympiacos' fans in my life." PSG and Brazil international winger Lucas Moura in an interview with goal.com stated that Olympiacos home ground was the most intense and heated stadium he's ever played in.

The Gate 7 tragedy 

The history of the Karaiskakis Stadium and Olympiacos was marked by the worst tragedy that ever hit Greek sports, known as the Karaiskakis Stadium disaster. On 8 February 1981, Olympiacos hosted AEK Athens for a league match, which ended 6–0, in an unprecedented triumph for the host team of Piraeus. During the last minutes of the game, thousands of Olympiacos fans at the Gate 7 rushed to the exit, to get to the stadium's main entrance and celebrate with the players, but the doors were almost closed and the turnstiles still in place, making the exit almost impossible. As people continued to come down from the stands, unable to see what happened, the stairs of Gate 7 became a death trap; people were crushed, tens of fans were seriously injured and twenty-one young people died, most of them by suffocation.

In memory of this event, every year on 8 February, there is a memorial service at the stadium in honour of the supporters that died in that incident. The service is attended by thousands of fans every year, who are rhythmically shouting the phrase, "Αδέρφια, ζείτε, εσείς μας οδηγείτε." (Adhélfia, zíte, esís mas odhiyíte, "Brothers, you live, you are the ones who guide us."). At the tribune part of the stadium where Gate 7 is now, some seats are colored black instead of red, shaping the number "7", whereas there is also a monument on the eastern side of the stadium, bearing the names of all 21 supporters killed on that day in the stadium.

Even though this incident affected almost solely the fanbase of Olympiacos, other teams occasionally pay their respects to the people killed as well, as they consider the incident to be a tragedy not only for one team, but for the whole country. In the past, even foreign teams, such as Liverpool and Red Star Belgrade, have honoured the incident's victims.

Rivalries 

Traditionally, Olympiacos' main rival is Panathinaikos and their so-called "derby of the eternal enemies" is a classic local derby in Attica, the most famous fixture in Greek football and one of the most well known around the world. The two clubs are the most successful, having won together a total of 67 League titles (Olympiacos 47, Panathinaikos 20), and the most popular football clubs in Greece. The rivalry also encompasses social, cultural and regional differences; Olympiacos, coming from the famous port of Piraeus, used to be very popular in the working to middle classes, while Panathinaikos, of downtown Athens, was considered the representative of middle to higher social classes, although this differentiation has weakened nowadays and the two clubs have similar fanbases. Most recent notorious incidents include a fan's death in 2007, during a pre-arranged clash between hooligans on the occasion of a women's volleyball game between the two clubs, which caused major upset in Greece, and the abandonment of a derby in 2012 after riots at the Athens Olympic Stadium, which resulted in major fires in parts of it.

Olympiacos also shares a traditional rivalry with AEK Athens, in one more local derby of the Greek capital with the other member of the so-called Big three, but also with PAOK, in the fiercest inter-city rivalry in Greece between the most popular clubs of the two largest Greek cities, Athens and Thessaloniki, a rivalry that erupted in the 1960s for the sake of footballer Giorgos Koudas. A popular rivalry used to be the Piraeus derby, between Olympiacos and Ethnikos Piraeus, the second most successful football club in the region, but the fixture has faded-out due to Ethnikos' constant presence in lower divisions in the last decades. It remains a derby in water polo where Olympiacos and Ethnikos compete in the top division.

European performance

Olympiacos has a long presence in the UEFA competitions, debuting on 13 September 1959, against Milan for the 1959–60 European Cup, the first ever Greek club to compete in a European competition. Olympiacos was also the first Greek club to advance to the next round of any European competition, eliminating Zagłębie Sosnowiec for the 1963–64 European Cup Winners' Cup. Their best European campaigns are their presence in the 1998–99 UEFA Champions League quarter-finals, where they lost a semi-final spot in the last minutes by Juventus, and in the 1992–93 European Cup Winners' Cup quarter-finals, losing to Atlético Madrid.

Olympiacos is by far the highest ranked Greek club in the UEFA rankings, occupying the 37th place in Europe in the five-year ranking and the 31st in the ten-year ranking as of 2019. They are also the Greek team with the most wins in all European competitions, leading also the table with the most home and away wins, and the Greek team with the most games played in European level, celebrating their 200th match on 23 February 2010, against Bordeaux in the 2009–10 UEFA Champions League first knockout round. Olympiacos also holds the all-time record attendance for a Greek club of 75,263 in a 1982–83 European Cup match against Hamburg at the Athens Olympic Stadium.

Olympiacos has eliminated (in either knockout matches or group stages) clubs like Milan, Arsenal, Ajax, Benfica, Porto, Borussia Dortmund, Lazio, Celtic, Werder Bremen, Anderlecht, Monaco, Deportivo La Coruña, Hertha BSC, Cagliari, PSV Eindhoven, GNK Dinamo Zagreb and Standard Liège among others. They have spent most of their European history in the UEFA Champions League, where they are widely known for being a strong home side, having run some long-standing sequences, such as the 15 straight UEFA Champions League unbeaten home matches since their debut in the tournament under its new format, when Manchester United stopped their record in their fifth consecutive participation, and their 15 wins in 19 UEFA Champions League home matches between 2009–10 and 2014–15. They have a vast record of home wins over traditional European powerhouses and UEFA Champions League winners like Real Madrid, Milan, Liverpool, Manchester United, Ajax, Juventus, Arsenal, Borussia Dortmund, Benfica, Porto, Celtic, Olympique Lyonnais, Olympique Marseille, Atlético Madrid, Valencia, Sevilla, Leverkusen, Galatasaray, Fenerbahçe, Red Star Belgrade, PSV Eindhoven among many others. Olympiacos has also won the Balkans Cup in 1963, at a time when the competition was considered the second most important in the region after the European Cup, becoming the first ever Greek club to win an international competition.

From 2007 to 2016 Olympiacos participated seven times in the UEFA Champions League Group Stage, and gathered at least 9 points in every one of those seven groups, qualifying three times for the knockout stage (Last 16) of the competition (2007–08, 2009–10, 2013–14).

UEFA competition record

Best campaigns

UEFA ranking 

5-year club ranking at the end of season 2018–19.

10-year club ranking at the end of season 2018–19.

Honours

Domestic competitions 
 Super League Greece
 Winners (47) (record): 1930–31, 1932–33, 1933–34, 1935–36, 1936–37, 1937–38, 1946–47, 1947–48, 1950–51, 1953–54, 1954–55, 1955–56, 1956–57, 1957–58, 1958–59, 1965–66, 1966–67, 1972–73, 1973–74, 1974–75, 1979–80, 1980–81, 1981–82, 1982–83, 1986–87, 1996–97, 1997–98, 1998–99, 1999–2000, 2000–01, 2001–02, 2002–03, 2004–05, 2005–06, 2006–07, 2007–08, 2008–09, 2010–11, 2011–12, 2012–13, 2013–14, 2014–15, 2015–16, 2016–17, 2019–20, 2020–21, 2021–22
 Greek Cup
 Winners (28) (record): 1946–47, 1950–51, 1951–52, 1952–53, 1953–54, 1956–57, 1957–58, 1958–59, 1959–60, 1960–61, 1962–63, 1964–65, 1967–68, 1970–71, 1972–73, 1974–75, 1980–81, 1989–90, 1991–92, 1998–99, 2004–05, 2005–06, 2007–08, 2008–09, 2011–12, 2012–13, 2014–15, 2019–20
 Greek Super Cup
 Winners (4) (record): 1980, 1987, 1992, 2007
 Greater Greece Cup
 Winners (3) (record): 1969, 1972, 1976

Olympiacos in European competitions
 UEFA Champions League:
 Quarter–Finals: 1998–99
 UEFA Cup Winners' Cup:
 Quarter–Finals: 1992–93
 Balkans Cup
 Winners (1): 1963

Regional 
 Piraeus FCA Championship
 Winners (25) (record): 1925, 1926, 1927, 1929, 1930, 1931, 1934, 1935, 1937, 1938, 1940, 1946, 1947, 1948, 1949, 1950, 1951, 1952, 1953, 1954, 1955, 1956, 1957, 1958, 1959

Doubles 
 Winners (18) (record): 1946–47, 1950–51, 1953–54, 1956–57, 1957–58, 1958–59, 1972–73, 1974–75, 1980–81, 1998–99, 2004–05, 2005–06, 2007–08, 2008–09, 2011–12, 2012–13, 2014–15, 2019–20

Players

Current squad

Reserves and Academy

Other players under contract

Out on loan

Former players

Personnel

Coaching staff

Technical staff

Scouting staff

Medical staff

Management

Former presidents

Statistics

Greek Championship records

See also

 Olympiacos B
 Olympiacos CFP
 Olympiacos F.C. Youth Academy
 European Club Association

References

External links 

Official websites
 Official website 
 Olympiacos at Super League 
 Olympiacos at UEFA
 RedStore

 
Association football clubs established in 1925
Football
1925 establishments in Greece
Football clubs in Piraeus
Unrelegated association football clubs